Górale may refer to:

Gorals, a group of people indigenous to Polish, Czech and Slovak mountain areas
Górale, Kuyavian-Pomeranian Voivodeship (north-central Poland)
Górale, Łódź Voivodeship (central Poland)